Hector Renato Iturrate Azócar (20 March 1922 – 7 June 2021) was a Chilean cyclist. He competed in the individual and team road race events at the 1948 Summer Olympics. He later married track athlete Eliana Gaete.

References

External links
 

1922 births
2021 deaths
Chilean male cyclists
Olympic cyclists of Chile
Cyclists at the 1948 Summer Olympics
People from Los Ángeles, Chile